Bijoynagar is an upazila of Brahmanbaria District in the Division of Chittagong, Bangladesh.

Geography

History
Previously it was a part of Tripura District.
In 1618 C.E. during the reign of( Mughal Emperor) Nuruddin 
Mohammad Jahangir, his commander in chief Daud Khan occupied this area from the king of Tripura. This locality was renamed as Daudpur Pargana after his name. After the struggle he ( Daud Khan)  settled  here as administrative lord. This pargana was annexed with the pargana
Jalalpur (Mymensingh).The British came into Bengal as Dewan (Revenue collector) in 1765 C.E. They created many districts for their administrative purposes. Again they established Tripura as District in 1790. Daudpur Pargana was also a part of Mymensingh. In 1860, the government established Brahmanbaria as sub- division. Daudpur, Sarail, Bejura and Haripur were separated from Mymensingh and submitted to Brahmanbaria.Ershed government promoted Brahmanbaria as Zilla in 1984 from sub-Division (Biplob, 16.4.2017)

Administration
Bijoynagar Upazila is divided into ten union parishads: Bhudanty, Bishupor, Chandura, Char Islampur, Champaknagar, Harashpur, Ichhapur, Paharpur, Pattan, and Singerbil. The union parishads are subdivided into 164 mauzas and 225 villages.

References

 
Upazilas of Brahmanbaria District